Gran Colombia de Aviación S.A.S., operating as GCA Airlines, was a Colombian airline subsidiary of Avior Airlines. It was registered at Ibague, based in the city of Cali and with a hub at Alfonso Bonilla Aragón International Airport in the city of Palmira that provided its services to the city from Santiago de Cali.

History
GCA Airlines was registered with the Chamber of Commerce of the city of Ibague on August 17, 2017, and permits were also requested from the Colombian Civil Aeronautics on August 30 of the same year in order to have its constitution as a transportation company approved, along with several national and international routes. On that occasion, Civil Aeronautics approved its constitution as well as all the requested routes except for the Cali - Valencia route, which was postponed.

Initially, in the request submitted to Aerocivil, the Perales Airport in the city of Ibague was conceived as the airline's hub, but the delay in the modernization works of the airport limited progress in its certification, prompting the request for the transfer to Alfonso Bonilla Aragón International Airport.

Although the Cali - Valencia route was postponed, it was reconsidered and approved by Aerocivil considering that it is a Colombian airline and the current restriction only applies to Venezuelan airlines until the moment in which reciprocity and equitable access issues are normalized the markets.

On July 11, 2018, the airline’s first aircraft arrived at El Dorado International Airport, a Boeing 737-400 that was later moved to Cali to start the certification procedures before the Civil Aeronautics. On November 29, 2019, the airline commenced operations with a flight between the Alfonso Bonilla Aragón International Airport in Cali, and the Rafael Núñez International Airport in the city of Cartagena.

On April 25, 2022, GCA Airlines had suspended their operations due to financial difficulties. The airline was folded in January 2023.

Destinations

By June 2021, GCA Airlines flew to the following destinations:

Fleet
, GCA Airlines operated the following aircraft:

See also
Avior Airlines
List of airlines of Colombia

References

External links
Official Website

Defunct airlines of Colombia
2017 establishments in Colombia
Airlines established in 2017
2022 disestablishments in Colombia
Airlines disestablished in 2022
Colombian brands